Demidov or Demidova (feminine; Демидова) is a Russian last name and may refer to:

The Demidovs, a family of rich Russian entrepreneurs in the 18th–19th centuries, including:
Elim Demidov, 3rd prince of San Donato 
Alexander Demidov (1915-?), a Soviet soldier and Hero of the Soviet Union
Alexei Demidov (b. March 7, 1936), a Russian general, commander of the Soviet Forces in Hungary in 1988-1989.
Alla Demidova (b. 1936), a Soviet/Russian actress
Anna Demidova (1878-1918), a chambermaid in Russian court
Georgy Demidov (1908–1987), a Russian writer and political prisoner
Igor Demidov (1873-1946), a Russian politician
Ivan Demidov (b. 1981), a Russian poker player
Nikolay Ivanovich Demidov (1773-1833), Russian general and politician
Pavel Evgenjevič Demidov (1971–2020), a Russian caver and speleologist
Rostislav Demidov (b. 1922), a Soviet aircraft pilot and Hero of the Soviet Union 
Vladimir Demidov (b. 1964), a Soviet and Russian footballer
Vladimir Demidov (pilot) (1913-1980), a Soviet aircraft pilot and Hero of the Soviet Union 
Vadim Demidov Norvegian-Latvian Footballer
Yakov Demidov (1889–1918), a Russian Bolshevik